Patrick Vollrath (born 1985 in Eisdorf am Harz) is a German filmmaker, best known for his short film Everything Will Be Okay that earned him critical appraisal and several awards and nominations including Best Foreign Film Award Bronze Medal at 42nd Annual Student Film Awards, and Academy Award for Best Live Action Short Film nomination at the 88th Academy Awards.

Filmography

Awards

References

External links
 
 

Living people
People from Göttingen (district)
Film people from Lower Saxony
1985 births